St Andrews is a small town in the south Canterbury region of New Zealand's South Island. It is located on State Highway 1 five kilometres south of Pareora and 17 kilometres south of Timaru. It was linked to Timaru by rail in 1876, and grew after the subdivision of the Pareora Run. It remains a rural service town.

Demographics
The settlement is part of the larger Lyalldale statistical area.

Saint Andrews had a population of 195 at the 2018 New Zealand census, an increase of 15 people (8.3%) since the 2013 census, and an increase of 18 people (10.2%) since the 2006 census. There were 72 households. There were 105 males and 90 females, giving a sex ratio of 1.17 males per female. The median age was 50.1 years (compared with 37.4 years nationally), with 30 people (15.4%) aged under 15 years, 27 (13.8%) aged 15 to 29, 102 (52.3%) aged 30 to 64, and 39 (20.0%) aged 65 or older.

Ethnicities were 95.4% European/Pākehā, 13.8% Māori, 1.5% Asian, and 1.5% other ethnicities (totals add to more than 100% since people could identify with multiple ethnicities).

Although some people objected to giving their religion, 55.4% had no religion, and 33.8% were Christian.

Of those at least 15 years old, 6 (3.6%) people had a bachelor or higher degree, and 57 (34.5%) people had no formal qualifications. The median income was $23,900, compared with $31,800 nationally. The employment status of those at least 15 was that 78 (47.3%) people were employed full-time, 24 (14.5%) were part-time, and 9 (5.5%) were unemployed.

Lyalldale statistical area

Lyalldale had a population of 687 at the 2018 New Zealand census, an increase of 51 people (8.0%) since the 2013 census, and an increase of 99 people (16.8%) since the 2006 census. There were 243 households. There were 369 males and 315 females, giving a sex ratio of 1.17 males per female. The median age was 43.3 years (compared with 37.4 years nationally), with 144 people (21.0%) aged under 15 years, 99 (14.4%) aged 15 to 29, 339 (49.3%) aged 30 to 64, and 105 (15.3%) aged 65 or older.

Ethnicities were 94.3% European/Pākehā, 9.6% Māori, 0.9% Pacific peoples, 2.6% Asian, and 1.7% other ethnicities (totals add to more than 100% since people could identify with multiple ethnicities).

The proportion of people born overseas was 13.5%, compared with 27.1% nationally.

Although some people objected to giving their religion, 50.7% had no religion, 36.7% were Christian, 0.9% were Hindu, 0.4% were Buddhist and 1.7% had other religions.

Of those at least 15 years old, 54 (9.9%) people had a bachelor or higher degree, and 141 (26.0%) people had no formal qualifications. The median income was $31,800, compared with $31,800 nationally. 69 people (12.7%) earned over $70,000 compared to 17.2% nationally. The employment status of those at least 15 was that 303 (55.8%) people were employed full-time, 87 (16.0%) were part-time, and 18 (3.3%) were unemployed.

Education 
St Andrew's School is a full primary school serving years 1 to 8, with a roll of  students as of  The school opened in 1881.

References

Waimate District
Populated places in Canterbury, New Zealand